The North American beaver (Castor canadensis) had a historic range that overlapped the Sierra Nevada in California. Before the European colonization of the Americas, beaver were distributed from the arctic tundra to the deserts of northern Mexico. The California Golden beaver subspecies (Castor canadensis subauratus) was prevalent in the Sacramento and San Joaquin River watersheds, including their tributaries in the Sierra Nevada. Recent evidence indicates that beaver were native to the High Sierra until their extirpation in the nineteenth century.

Until recently, beavers were considered invasive species. Beavers and their dams are still being removed by wildlife managers in the Sierra Nevada despite evidence of having been indigenous to the area and of their beneficial effects on biodiversity for fish and other species in mountain wetland ecosystems.

Historical range and distribution

In 1916, Harold Bryant wrote in California Fish and Game, "The beaver of our mountain districts has been entirely exterminated and there are but a few hundred survivors to be found along the Sacramento, Colorado and San Joaquin Rivers." Earlier, in 1906, Frank Stephens wrote in "California Mammals" that Castor canadensis' historic range was from the "Pacific slope from Alaska to central California east to and including the Sierra Nevada and Cascade Mountains" and adds "In most parts of California the presence of beavers is only made known by the stumps of the trees and saplings that they have cut." McIntyre hypothesized that beaver were trapped out of the Sierra early in the nineteenth century by trappers before records could be kept. Other early twentieth century naturalists (Grinnell, Tappe, etc.) questioned whether the California Golden beaver dwelt above  of elevation in the Sierra. Recently novel physical evidence has demonstrated that beaver were native to the Sierra until at least the mid-nineteenth century, via radiocarbon dating of buried beaver dam wood uncovered by deep channel incision in two locations in Red Clover Creek in the Feather River watershed. That report was supported by a summary of indirect evidence of beaver including reliable observer accounts of beaver in multiple watersheds from the northern to the southern Sierra Nevada, including its eastern slope.

Reintroduction to the Sierra

California Golden beaver taken from Snelling, California (elevation  and Waterford, California (elevation ) were stocked in 1940 at Mather Station (elevation ) west of Yosemite National Park and in 1944 at Fish Camp (elevation ) by the California Department of Fish and Game (CDFG). A second reference confirms that the CDFG re-introductions of beaver into Mariposa County in the Merced River watershed were all C. C. subauratus (Golden beaver) taken from near sea level elevations. These lowland beaver adapted to the high Sierra without difficulty.

Castor canadensis were re-introduced to the Tahoe Basin by the CDFG and the U. S. Forest Service between 1934 and 1949 in order to prevent stream degradation and to promote wetland restoration. Descended from no more than nine individuals from the Snake River in Idaho, 1987 beaver populations on the upper and lower Truckee River had reached a density of 0.72 colonies (3.5 beavers) per kilometer.

Ecology

Effects on aspen, cottonwood and willow
In 1987, Beier reported that beaver had caused local extinction of Quaking aspen (Populus tremuloides) and Black cottonwood (Populus trichocarpa) on 4-5% of stream reaches on the lower Truckee River, however Willow (Salix spp.) showed good vigor despite heavy use in most reaches. He further speculated that without control of beaver populations that aspen and cottonwood could go extinct on the Truckee River. However, not only have aspen and cottonwood survived ongoing beaver colonization but a recent study of ten Tahoe streams utilizing aerial multispectral videography has shown that deciduous, thick herbaceous, and thin herbaceous vegetation are more highly concentrated near beaver dams, whereas coniferous trees are decreased. These findings are consistent with those of Pollock, who reported that in Bridge Creek, a stream in semi-arid eastern Oregon, the width of riparian vegetation on stream banks was increased several-fold as beaver dams watered previously dry terraces adjacent to the stream.

Effects on salmonids
Until recently, beaver were considered pests who caused flooding and impaired the passage of spawning trout and salmon. However, it has been shown that trout and salmon move freely across beaver dams.

Current control methods
Recently beaver have been documented in the upper and lower Truckee River, Ward Creek, Cold Creek, Taylor Creek, Meeks Creek, Blackwood Creek, and King's Beach, so the descendants of the original nine beavers have apparently migrated around most of Lake Tahoe.
All of the beaver dams in Taylor Creek, which flows from Fallen Leaf Lake to Lake Tahoe, are destroyed annually each fall by the U. S. Forest Service in order for Kokanee salmon (Oncorhynchus nerka) to spawn. A recent study of Taylor Creek showed that the beaver dam removal decreased wetland habitat, increased stream flow, and increased total phosphorus pollutants entering Lake Tahoe - all factors which negatively impact the clarity of the lake's water. In addition, beaver dams located in Ward Creek, located on the west shore of Lake Tahoe, were also shown to decrease nutrients and sediments traveling downstream.

The California Department of Fish and Game is using beaver control methods instead of flow devices in the Tahoe area. In 2006 the town of Truckee worked with the CDFG and the Lahontan Regional Water Quality Control Board to remove beaver dams from Trout Creek because of rising creek levels by de-watering and dredging a 500-foot section near Donner Pass Road.  In November 2009, a beaver family was caught in snares underwater and drowned in Griff Creek in King's Beach, California, when Placer County Department of Public Works ordered their removal for fear that the beaver would cause flooding. When another beaver family of four recolonized Griff Creek in 2010, officials had them shot.

See also
 California Fur Rush
 Mountain beaver
 Martinez, California beavers
 Ecology of the Sierra Nevada

References

External links
 Keep Me Wild: Beaver, California Department of Fish and Wildlife
 "Worth a Dam" (beaver information and educational site)

Fauna of the Sierra Nevada (United States)
Sierra Nevada